Tinga Nursery is a historic plant nursery and national historic district located near Wrightsboro, New Hanover County, North Carolina. It was established in 1906.  Contributing resources include the Bungalow / American Craftsman style main house (1918), wash house and wood shed, employee's quarters, big barn, bulb barn and pump house, old office, new office, potting shed, garage, nursery lanes, field patterns, drainage ditches, cold frame, and pond.

It was listed on the National Register of Historic Places in 2000.

References

Commercial buildings on the National Register of Historic Places in North Carolina
Houses completed in 1918
Buildings and structures in New Hanover County, North Carolina
National Register of Historic Places in New Hanover County, North Carolina
Historic districts on the National Register of Historic Places in North Carolina